Dolenja Vas is a settlement in the Municipality of Zagorje ob Savi in central Slovenia. It extends from the western outskirts of Zagorje ob Savi to the left bank of the Sava River. The area is part of the traditional region of Upper Carniola. It is now included with the rest of the municipality in the Central Sava Statistical Region.

References

External links
Dolenja Vas on Geopedia

Populated places in the Municipality of Zagorje ob Savi